North Hanover Mall is a shopping mall in Hanover, Pennsylvania. It is anchored by Dick's Sporting Goods, Burlington, and Rural King.

History
The mall opened in 1967 as an open-air strip including W.T. Grant, Town & Country (a discount chain then owned by Lane Bryant), Sears, and Food Fair. In 1969 and 1970, it underwent reconstruction to become an enclosed shopping mall, with The Bon-Ton moving from an existing store downtown and JCPenney joining. The Town & Country store became Kmart, which moved out in 1995 to a Superstore nearby that closed in 2004 and became Black Rose Antiques. The Bon-Ton moved out in 2006. After Black Rose Antiques moved out of the mall, construction began in 2007 to demolish the former Black Rose building for a Dick's Sporting Goods, while also demolishing the former Bon-Ton for a two-story Boscov's. Although Boscov's was originally to open in 2008, its opening date was later pushed back to 2009, but in April of that year, the mall's manager confirmed that Boscov's would not be opening in that space. In 2012, JCPenney moved into the space originally planned for Boscov's.

Pennsylvania Real Estate Investment Trust announced on September 9, 2014 that it sold the North Hanover Mall, as well as State College's Nittany Mall, for a combined $32.3 million. The name of the buyer was not immediately available, and a trust spokesperson was not available for comment. Pennsylvania Real Estate Investment Trust owns and manages malls in 12 states in the eastern United States. It sold the North Hanover Mall as part of a portfolio-improvement initiative it launched in 2012, which involved selling underperforming properties. The 452,000-square-foot North Hanover Mall had sales of $275 per square foot at the end of June and a non-anchor occupancy of 72.8 percent, according to the trust. Sales and occupancy at the mall lagged the trust's portfolio, which had averaged sales of $378 per square foot and non-anchor occupancy of 89.5 percent for the same time period. The buyer of the mall was Mason Asset Management of Great Neck, New York.

On January 4, 2018, it was announced that Sears would be closing as part of a plan to close 103 stores nationwide. The store closed in April 2018. On June 4, 2020, JCPenney announced that this location would be closing on October 18, 2020 as part of a plan to close 154 stores nationwide. A Rural King store opened in the former Sears location in Spring of 2021. Hiring for the new anchor store began in mid December of 2020. On March 28, 2022, a fire broke out on the roof of the former JCPenney building in one of the HVAC units, causing an estimated $1 million in damage to the building as well as the attached mall.

References

External links
 North Hanover Mall

Buildings and structures in York County, Pennsylvania
Shopping malls established in 1967
Shopping malls in Pennsylvania
Tourist attractions in York County, Pennsylvania
Hanover, Pennsylvania